D.O.A.: A Right of Passage is a 1980 rockumentary film directed by Lech Kowalski (his premiere film as a director) about the origin of punk rock.  The rockumentary takes interview and concert footage of some of punk rock's earliest bands of the late seventies scene.  Features live performances by the Sex Pistols, The Dead Boys, Generation X (with Billy Idol), The Rich Kids, X-Ray Spex, and Sham 69, with additional music from The Clash, Iggy Pop, and Augustus Pablo.

Plot
The film centers around the Sex Pistols 1978 tour of the United States which ended with the group breaking up. The tour was the only one the group played in the U.S. during their original run. Film director Lech Kowalski followed them with handheld cameras through the clubs and bars of their seven-city Southern tour.  Mixing this with footage of other contemporary bands, trends in the fashion capitals, and punks of all shapes and colors, Kowalski created a grainy, stained snapshot of a movement at its peak, showing how certain authority figures saw the movement as a threat.

It features interview footage (including the famous interview of Sid Vicious and Nancy Spungen in bed), and behind the scenes shots from the tour as well as interviews with audience members who had strong and widely varied reactions to the group.

The majority of the material surrounds the Pistols tour as well but it also included other performances by first wave Punk acts such as The Dead Boys and Generation X with Billy Idol.

This indie film was shot mostly in bars and clubs on 16mm film, and documented early years of punk from both in front of and behind the stage.

The film's poster is featured prominently in one scene of the 1981 film Neighbors. D.O.A. also featured in The Filth and the Fury, a 2000 rockumentary film about the Sex Pistols directed by Julien Temple, and in the 2002 television series Hollywood Rocks the Movies: The 1970s.

Release
The film premiered at the 1980 Festival of Festivals, before having its commercial premiere on April 10, 1981 at the Waverly Theater in New York City.

The DVD was released in Japan in 2003. However it is released in Region 0.

In 2017, the film was released on Blu-ray as the inaugural release of the MVD Rewind Collection.

Cast (in alphabetical order)

 Stiv Bators as himself (The Dead Boys)
 Terry Chimes as himself (The Clash)
 The Clash as themselves
 Paul Cook as himself (Sex Pistols)
 The Dead Boys as themselves
 Generation X as themselves
 Jonathan Guinness as himself
 Topper Headon as himself (The Clash)
 Billy Idol as himself (Generation X)
 Tony James as himself (Generation X)
 Mick Jones as himself (The Clash)
 Steve Jones as himself (Sex Pistols)
 John Lydon as himself (Johnny Rotten)
 Glen Matlock as himself (The Rich Kids)
 Gene October as himself (Generation X)
 Augustus Pablo as himself
 Bernard Brooke Partridge as himself - Council Member
 Rich Kids as themselves
 Heidi Robinson as herself - Tour Manager
 Sex Pistols as themselves
 Sham 69 as themselves
 Paul Simonon as himself (The Clash)
 Nancy Spungen as herself
 Joe Strummer as himself (The Clash)
 Terry Sylvester as himself
 Terry and the Idiots as themselves
 Sid Vicious as himself
 Mary Whitehouse as herself - Anti-Smut Crusader
 X-Ray Spex as themselves

Songs performed
The musical performances/tracks contained in the documentary are as follows:

 "Nightclubbing"  Written by Iggy Pop and David Bowie;  performed by Iggy Pop
 "Anarchy in the U.K."  Written by Paul Cook, Steve Jones, Glen Matlock and John Lydon;  performed by the Sex Pistols
 "Oh Bondage Up Yours"  Written by Poly Styrene;  performed by X-Ray Spex
 "God Save the Queen" Written by Paul Cook, Steve Jones, Glen Matlock and John Lydon;  performed by the Sex Pistols
 "Pretty Vacant"  Written by Paul Cook, Steve Jones, Glen Matlock and John Lydon;  performed by The Rich Kids
 "Liar" Written by Paul Cook, Steve Jones, Glen Matlock and John Lydon;  performed by the Sex Pistols
 "Police and Thieves" Written by Lee "Scratch" Perry and Junior Murvin;  performed by The Clash (CBS Records)
 "Kiss Me Deadly"  Written and performed by Generation X (Chrysalis Records)
 "I Wanna Be Me" Written by Paul Cook, Steve Jones, Glen Matlock and John Lydon;  performed by the Sex Pistols
 "Lust for Life"  Written by Iggy Pop and David Bowie;  performed by Iggy Pop
 "All This And More" Performed by The Dead Boys (Sire Records);  recorded live by Joe Sutherland
 "Pretty Vacant" Written by Paul Cook, Steve Jones, Glen Matlock and John Lydon;  performed by the Sex Pistols
 "No Fun" – Sex Pistols
 "New York" Written by Paul Cook, Steve Jones, Glen Matlock and John Lydon;  performed by the Sex Pistols
 "Rip Off" Performed by Sham 69;  recorded live at Roundhouse Studios
 "Borstal Breakout" Performed by Sham 69;  recorded live at Roundhouse Studios
 "I Wanna Be a Dead Boy" performed by The Dead Boys
 "Holidays in the Sun" – Sex Pistols
 "Holidays in the Sun" Written by Paul Cook, Steve Jones, John Lydon and Sid Vicious;  performed by The Sex Pistols
 "E.M.I." Written by Paul Cook, Steve Jones, Glen Matlock and John Lydon;  performed by the Sex Pistols
 "Bodies" Written by Paul Cook, Steve Jones, John Lydon and Sid Vicious;  performed by the Sex Pistols
 "A. P. Special" Written and performed by Augustus Pablo

References

External links
 D.O.A.: A Right of Passage Review by Richie Unterberger at Allmovie
 D.O.A. Review at Channel 4 Film
 
 
 Survival Instincts  by Ed Halter at The Village Voice

1980 films
1980 documentary films
American documentary films
The Clash
Documentary films about punk music and musicians
Sex Pistols
Films shot in 16 mm film
1980s English-language films
1980s American films